GKART, also known as QQ Speed or Speed Drifters, is a massively multiplayer online kart racing game developed by TiMi Studio Group and published by Tencent Games and Garena. The game was originally released in China as QQ Speed in 2010 and gained enormous popularity in China, with a record number of 2 million players online at the same time in 2011. The game was heavily inspired by Nintendo's Mario Kart franchise.

Garena introduced GKART to 13 countries including Singapore, Malaysia, Australia and the United States in 2011. GKART was selected into the World Cyber Games (WCG) at Singapore and China the same year. The game was shut down on 31 March 2012, before it was later re-released. The mobile game version was launched on 29 December 2017 as QQ Speed: Mobile in China, and on 16 January 2019 as Garena Speed Drifters for markets outside mainland China.

, QQ Speed has  players worldwide, including  mobile players. The mobile version grossed  during 20172018.

Gameplay
GKART is a kart racing game of extremely simplified keyboard control. Besides directional controls, the fundamental keys of GKART are Drifting and Nitrous boost. In speed mode, drifting accumulates N2O, which converts into usable speed boost when a full tank is reached. In props mode, various items can be used to hinder opponents’ race. Hence GKART is designed for both casual players and professional racers. GKART also features a comprehensive avatar system to satisfy players’ pursuit of uniqueness.

Features
GKART has built in many features in order to attract players of different gaming demography.

Shop
Players gain their in-game items mainly through purchase in shops. The items are divided into two sections which require different kinds of in-game currency. The types of items include karts, avatar items, kart cosmetics, actions and pets. By referring to pop culture, the shop system has become the greatest attraction in GKART game.

Pit stop
Pit stop functions like a graphic chat room in GKART. The purpose of the pit stop is for players to exchange thoughts, related to the game or not. Players can also perform actions including flying, sleeping and PK. Pit stop will give experience to the players proportional to the length of their stay.

Border race
Border races allows players to put their skills to real test. Players need to pay a certain amount of in-game coupons to enter the race. System will match up players with similar level. The winners of the border races will be highly rewarded. They will also be rewarded honour points which would give them superior titles.

Mission
By fulfilling certain requirements, players are able to gain experience, items and virtual currency through various missions. This includes items not buyable in shops and are often signs of prestige.

Intimacy
GKART encourages players to race together with their friends by creating the concept of intimacy. Players who are in-game friends will gain intimacy point through racing together or gifting each other. Higher intimacy will give higher experience bonus when friends race together. GKART also allows players to get married in-game. Married couples will have higher experience bonus compared to normal friends.

Clan system
In-game clan system is another way for players to interact and race together. Clans are self-organized player group which often targets at competitive racing. Players usually find joining a clan helpful in training up skills and seeking in-game buddies. Clan ranking will recognize clan member's activeness and their triumphs in competitive racing.

Pet system
Pet is a special kind of avatar item in GKART. Pet has its own levelling system. Different pets offer different benefits to the players, and they become increasingly potent as they level up.

Music system
GKART has a unique in-game music system, whereby players are able to add songs of their own choice into the playlist.

Some of these songs are from Asia.

License
As players level up in GKART, they can earn the right to take higher level license tests. The license is not only an indication of their skills and experience in the game, but also opens up more tracks and items for the players.

Kart mod
Kart mod is an option for senior players to do intricate adjustments to their kart. The kart mod offers 5 kinds of upgrades to the kart, affecting kart nitrous boost, acceleration and handling etc.

Game modes

Speed mode
Players will manoeuvre their kart around corners with drifts to accumulate N2O, and use Nitrous boost on straight roads. Speed matters most. In team speed mode, the players will be given score for the respective position they finish in, and the winning team will have the higher total score.

Props mode
In Props mode, players cannot drift to build up N2O. Instead, players will pick up special items which give them an edge over their opponents. The items include:
Angel – Protect against other items
Orange Peel – Kart speeding over it will spin out of control
Devil – Cause opponents to invert directions
Fog – Obstruct  the view of players driving through
Koopy – A homing missile which suspends opponent in air
Magnet – Slowing target while accelerating own kart
Missile – Blows target into the air
N2O – Give speed boost
Tornado – Suspends all opponents trapped inside
UFO – Slows down the first player
In team props mode, the first player to cross the finish line will earn victory for the whole team.

Battle arena mode
In battle arena, players’ target is to collect as much “kubi” as possible, while using items to attack others to reduce their “kubi” counts. The players with least “kubis” will be eliminated periodically. The last one standing will be the winner of the arena.

Story mode
The story mode consists of series of missions with plotline and different kinds of challenges. Players will role play the mature and determined Matt or the energetic and flamboyant Ken, to race against the legendary Blizzard Clan.

See also
 Garena
 Kart racing

References

External links 
 

2010 video games
Android (operating system) games
IOS games
Multiplayer online games
Inactive multiplayer online games
Kart racing video games
Racing video games
Products and services discontinued in 2012
Video games developed in China
Windows games
Garena games